Chip Hooper and Mel Purcell were the defending champions, but Hooper did not participate this year.  Purcell partnered Trey Waltke, losing in the semifinals.

Chris Lewis and Pavel Složil won the title, defeating Anders Järryd and Tomáš Šmíd 6–4, 6–2 in the final.

Seeds

  Anders Järryd /  Tomáš Šmíd (final)
  Chris Lewis /  Pavel Složil (champions)
  Eric Fromm /  Shlomo Glickstein (quarterfinals)
  Stanislav Birner /  João Soares (first round)

Draw

Draw

External links
 Draw

1983 Grand Prix (tennis)
1983 BMW Open